Van der Madeweg is an Amsterdam Metro station in Duivendrecht, Netherlands.

The Station

The station opened in 1977 and is served by 3 lines, the 50 (Isolatorweg - Gein), 53 (Amsterdam Centraal - Gaasperplas) and 54 (Amsterdam Centraal - Gein).

The metro station is only accessible with an OV-chipkaart or GVB Travel Pass.

Change at this station between lines 50, 53 and 54.

This station has the metro wasstraat, where the metro cars are washed.

References

GVB website 

Amsterdam Metro stations
Railway stations opened in 1977